Kabirvad is a banyan tree located on a small river island in the Narmada river. It is in Bharuch district, Gujarat, India. The tree and place is associated with 15th-century mystic-poet Kabir, and the location includes a temple dedicated to Kabir. The place is a religious site as well as a popular tourist spot.

Background
Nearchus, an admiral of Alexander the Great, described a large specimen on the banks of the Narmada River, possibly Kabirvad. The tree's canopy was so extensive, it sheltered 7,000 men.

Access
From Bharuch to Jhanor via Shuklatirth, there is a place known as Kabirmadhi. From here, a boat ride brings people to the river island.

Legend
Local legend has it that there were two Brahmin brothers, Jeeva and Tatva, in the village of Shuklatirth, near Mangleshwar, in Bharuch district, Gujarat. One day, the brothers were inspired to find a true saint. To do so, they planted a dried shoot of a banyan tree in their courtyard and surmised that whichever saint would turn the dried shoot green would be a true saint. In the end, they concluded that Kabir Sahib Ji turned the shoot green and therefore was a true saint. According to that legend, the shoot developed into Kabirvad.

See also
 List of banyan trees in India
 List of individual trees

References

Tourist attractions in Gujarat
Hindu temples in Gujarat
Flora of India (region)
River islands of India
Narmada River
Bharuch district